The 1951 Iowa State Teachers Panthers football team represented Iowa State Teachers College—now known as University of Northern Iowa—as a member of the North Central Conference (NCC) during the 1951 college football season. Led by 14th-year head coach Clyde Starbeck, the Panthers compiled an overall record of 3–4 with a mark of 3–3 in conference play, placing third in the NCC.

Schedule

References

Iowa State Teachers
Northern Iowa Panthers football seasons
Iowa State Teachers Panthers football